Please Love Me Forever is Bobby Vinton's sixteenth studio album, released in 1967. Two singles came from this album: the title track (previously a hit for Cathy Jean and the Roommates) and "Just as Much as Ever".

Cover versions include "Young Love", "It's All in the Game", "P.S. I Love You", "Bouquet of Roses", "Who's Sorry Now" and "After Loving You".

Bobby Vinton Cover Girl Contest 
In July 1966, Bobby Vinton's Epic label announced a contest in which the grand prize winner would be featured on his next album (which was this one) as well as an all-expense-paid weekend to New York and dinner date with Vinton at the Copacabana.  The contest ran from August 15 to October 5; the grand prize winner was Pamela Hammer of Pittsburgh, Pennsylvania (coincidentally, her suburban Pittsburgh hometown of Mt. Lebanon is just 30 minutes away from Bobby Vinton's hometown of Canonsburg).  Her photo and a short essay of her experience were placed at the bottom of the back cover.

Track listing

Personnel
Bobby Vinton – vocals
Billy Sherrill – producer
Bill McElhiney – arranger ("It's the Talk of the Town", "After Loving You" and "My Song of Love")

Charts
Album – Billboard (United States)

Singles – Billboard (United States)

References

1967 albums
Bobby Vinton albums
Albums arranged by Bill McElhiney
Albums produced by Billy Sherrill
Epic Records albums